Sterling Bank may refer to:

Operating banks
Sterling Bancorp, a bank based in Montebello, New York
Sterling Bank and Trust, a bank headquarters in Southfield, Michigan with branches in California and New York
Sterling Bank of Asia, a bank based in the Philippines
Sterling Bank, a bank based in Lagos

Defunct banks
American Sterling Bank, a bank that was based in Sugar Creek, Missouri
Park Sterling Bank, a bank that was based in Charlotte, North Carolina
Sterling Bank of Canada, a bank that was based in Toronto
Sterling Bank (Texas), a bank that was based in Houston, Texas
Sterling Financial Corporation, a bank that was based in Spokane, Washington